Craccum is the weekly magazine produced by the Auckland University Students' Association of the University of Auckland, New Zealand. It was founded in 1927. The name originated from the scrambled acronym of "Auckland University College Men's Common Room Committee".

Craccum is the largest student magazine in New Zealand, with a weekly distribution of 10,000–12,000 copies. 

The magazine has at times been controversial, with stories on how to shoplift, the drawbacks of various methods of committing suicide, drug use guides, recipes for illegal drugs and drug rape guides. Craccum is also a popular proving ground for New Zealand mainstream media, with many of its alumni moving on to publications such as The Listener, The New Zealand Herald, The National Business Review and Metro magazine.

In 1989 the publication was re-branded "Torso" for the final issues of that year, an event noted in the mainstream media. However the original name was re-established the following year.

In 2005, the rights to the front cover of the sellout-themed issue of Craccum were auctioned on TradeMe. Salient, the student magazine for Victoria University of Wellington, won the auction. In 2011 the rights to the front cover of the women's rights-themed issue were again auctioned on TradeMe, with proceeds going to Women's Refuge; the auction was won by the Tertiary Education Union (TEU).

Craccum is a member of the Aotearoa Student Press Association (ASPA).  In 2007, Craccum won the award for Best Publication at the ASPA Awards for the first time. It was awarded runner-up for Best Small Publication in 2016 and runner-up for Best Publication in 2017. In 2022, Craccum won the award for Best Publication at the ASPA Awards for the second time.

Editors 

The Craccum Editor was an elected position between 1986 and 2019. Before 1986, the Editor was appointed each year by the Craccum Administration Board. This practise was reinstated in 2019, following the introduction of a new AUSA constitution. The election for Craccum Editor was held in the second semester, on the same ballot as the AUSA portfolio elections.

Former Craccum Editor Tim Shadbolt (1972) is Mayor of Invercargill and former Mayor of Waitemata City. Mike Rann (1975) was Premier of South Australia 2002 to 2012.
 2022 – Flora Xie and Naomii Seah
 2021 – Eda Tang and Brian Gu
 2020 – Cameron Leakey and Daniel Meech 
 2019 – Bailley Verry
 2018 – Jasmin Singh and Helen Yeung (Feb to July), Caitlin Abley, Mark Fullerton and Samantha Gianotti (July to August), Andrew Winstanley (August to October)
 2017 – Samantha Gianotti and Catriona Britton
 2016 – Mark Fullerton and Caitlin Abley
 2015 – Matthew Denton and Jordan Margetts
 2014 – Ana Lenard and Kit Haines
 2013 – Aditya Vasudevan and Calum Redpath
 2012 – Thomas Dykes
 2011 – Spencer Dowson and Rhys Mathewson
 2010 – Dan Sloan
 2009 – Matthew Harnett and Valentine Watkins
 2008 – Dan Sloan
 2007 – Simon Coverdale and Matthew Backhouse
 2006 – Ryan Sproull
 2005 – Alec Hutchinson and Stian Overdahl
 2004 – Allan Swann and Hannah Jennings-Voykovich
 2003 – Christopher Garland
 2002 – Colin Mitchell and Susan Edmunds
 2001 – John Marshall
 2000 – Ben Thomas and James Cardno
 1999 – Gareth Elliot and Thomas Shadbolt
 1998 – Alistair Bone
 1997 – Martyn 'Bomber' Bradbury
 1996 – Tim Mullins and Anton Pichler
 1995 – Martyn 'Bomber' Bradbury and Stewart Gardiner
 1994 – Penny Murray
 1993 – Peter Malcouronne and Vangelis Vitalis
 1992 – Jo Mackay
 1991 – Jo Mackay
 1990 – Steve Amanono and Sarah Murray (Jan–May);  Peter Gray, Mark Roach, Simon Holroyd (Interim); Mark Roach, Wendy Newton, Peter Gray (Jun–Dec)
 1989 – Aidan-B. Howard (Jan–May);  Michael Lamb (May–Dec)
 1988 – Miriam de Graaf, Carl Fagan, Simon Holroyd and Wendy Lawson (Jan–Mar); Miriam de Graaf, Carl Fagan, Simon Holroyd (Mar–Jun);  Miriam de Graaf, Simon Holroyd (Jun–Dec)
 1987 – Rachael Callender, Derek Craig, Kerry Hoole, Ewen Smith, Patrick Stodart, Victoria Turner and David Ward
 1986 – Peter Boys
 1985 – Pam Goode and Brigitta Noble
 1984 – Neil Morrison and Rangi Chadwick
 1983 – Louise Rafkin
 1982 – David Faulls
 1981 – David Kirkpatrick
 1980 – Katherine White
 1979 – David Merritt
 1978 – Louise Chunn
 1977 – Francis Stark
 1976 – Allan Bell
 1975 – Mike Rann
 1974 – Brent Lewis
 1973 – Stephen Ballantyne, Bob Kerr, and Bob Hillier (from January to July)
 1972 – Heather McInnes, Tim Shadbolt and Gordon Clifton
 1971 – Stephen Chan, Robert Wellington
 1970 – Ted Sheehan
 1969 – Mac Price
 1968 – George de Bres
 1967 – Geoff Chapple (Mar–Jun);  George De Bres and Michael Volkering (Jun–Dec)
 1966 – Lei Lealulu and Dave Fleming (Jan–Jun);  Mike Morrissey (Jun–Dec)
 1965 – C. A. Moir
 1964 – John Sanders
 1963 – Dick Johnstone
 1962 – Francis J. Lillie
 1961 – Adrienne Rhodes
 1960 – Felicity Maidment
 1959 – Jonathan Hunt
 1958 – S. E. Cox and D. R. Taylor
 1957 – R. W. Armstrong
 1956 – D. J. Stone and R. W. Armstrong
 1955 – Jim Traue and David Stone
 1953 – Brian Smart and Peter Boag
 1952 – Gerald Utting (Jan–Aug);  John Anderson and Geoff Fuller (Aug–Dec)
 1951 – NO RECORD
 1950 – Peter Timm, David Grace and Roderick Smith (Jan–Mar);  Gerald Utting and M. Lovegrove (Mar–Dec)
 1949 – Peter Cape
 1948 – John Ellis (Jan–Sept);  Peter Cape (Sept–Dec)
 1947 – Nora Bayly
 1946 – J. A. Nathan
 1945 – R. I. F. Pattison
 1944 – Travis Wilson
 1943 – Betty Belshaw (née Sweetman)
 1942 – NO RECORD
 1941 – G. I. Cawkwell
 1940 – P. W. Day
 1939 – P. W. Day (Jan–Mar);  Avenal Holcombe (Mar–Dec)
 1938 – A. O. Woodhouse
 1937 – Eric H. Halstear
 1933–1936 – NO RECORD
 1932 – J. A. E. Mulgan 
 1931 – Eric Harold Blow
 1930 – P. L. Soljak (Jan–Jun);  J. A. E. Mulgan (Jun–Aug)
 1928–1929 – NO RECORD
 1927 A. K. Matthews, Nigel Wilson and Winifred McNickle

References

External links
 Official website

Student newspapers published in New Zealand
University of Auckland
Student magazines
Magazines published in New Zealand
Weekly magazines published in New Zealand
Mass media in Auckland
Magazines established in 1927